The Hamdan Sports Complex is a multi-purpose sports arena in Dubai, United Arab Emirates. The arena was completed in summer 2010. It hosted the 2010 FINA World Swimming Championships (25 m), in which 153 countries participated. It also hosted the final games of the 2014 FIBA Under-17 World Championship and the 2015 FIVB Volleyball Men's U23 World Championship. The stadium will host international aquatic events. It has total capacity of 15,000 spectators. Beside aquatic events, such as swimming, it will also accommodate badminton, basketball, karate, swimming, tennis, volleyball and water polo.

Notable events
 Asian Men's Volleyball Championship: 2013
 FINA Swimming World Cup: 2016
 Special Olympics World Games: 2019
 World Karate Championships: 2021
 World Swimming Championships: 2010

See also
Dubai Sports City
List of development projects in Dubai

References

External links
Official Website

Indoor arenas in the United Arab Emirates
Sports venues in Dubai
Badminton venues
Basketball venues in the United Arab Emirates
Netball venues in the United Arab Emirates
Swimming venues in the United Arab Emirates
International Premier Tennis League
2010 establishments in the United Arab Emirates
Sports venues completed in 2010